The 19º Corona Rally México, the third round of the 2005 World Rally Championship season took place from March 11–13, 2005.

Results

Retirements

  François Duval - mechanical (SS14)
  Daniel Solà - accident (SS11)
  Chris Atkinson - accident (SS14)
  Roman Kresta - suspension (SS9)

Special stages
All dates and times are CST (UTC−6).

References

External links
 Results at eWRC.com

Mexico
Rally Mexico
Rally